André Bugnon (born 13 September 1947) is a member of the Swiss National Council and was President of the National Council for the 2007/2008 term. A member of the Swiss People's Party (UDC/SVP), Bugnon was elected to the National Council in 1999 and re-elected in 2003 and 2007.

Bugnon was born in Saint-Prex, Vaud.  From 1988 to 1999, he was a member of the cantonal parliament of Vaud. He was mayor of his home town of Saint-Prex from 1990 to 2002.

External links

1947 births
Living people
People from Saint-Prex
Swiss People's Party politicians
Members of the National Council (Switzerland)
Presidents of the National Council (Switzerland)